King Neptune's Adventure is an unlicensed adventure game created for the Nintendo Entertainment System by Color Dreams. Players play as King Neptune, as they venture though ships, oceans and Atlantis.

Gameplay
Eight of King Neptune's treasures have been stolen over the years, including his most powerful one, the magical Orb of Peace. Those under the sea are worried, as peace is at risk. Players as King Neptune must return the Orb of Peace to King Neptune's castle and restore peace to his oceanic kingdom. King Neptune is armed with bouncing lightshots, as well as bubble bombs. Players collect health and bombs by destroying enemies. The 8 treasures can be recovered by beating bosses or with the help of the dolphins.

Cartridge 

Most of the game cartridges came in a baby blue color, but like most other Color Dreams games it also came in black, the black variant being more uncommon than the baby blue variant.

Other versions 
There is a French translated version of King Neptune's Adventure.

See also
List of Nintendo Entertainment System games
Color Dreams

References
Scan of game instruction manual (archived)
Tech and Rarity Info (archived)

Nintendo Entertainment System games
Nintendo Entertainment System-only games
Color Dreams games
1990 video games
Video games developed in the United States
Unauthorized video games
Single-player video games
Video games set in Atlantis